Jean Guillaume Barthélemy Thomières (18 August 1771 – 22 July 1812) was a French officer of the French Revolutionary Wars and the Napoleonic Wars.

He was killed in action at Salamanca while commanding an Imperial French infantry division. 

Thomières is one of the names inscribed under the Arc de Triomphe, on Column 38.

Career
He joined the army of the French First Republic in 1793 and fought the Spanish. He transferred to the Army of Italy in 1796 and was present at the battles of Dego, Mondovì, Lodi, Bassano, and Arcole. In 1800 he fought at Montebello and Marengo as an aide-de-camp to Claude Perrin Victor.

In 1806 Thomières joined the staff of Marshal Jean Lannes and served in Prussia and Poland. He was promoted to general officer in July 1807 and participated in the 1807 invasion of Portugal. On 20 August 1808 he was wounded while leading his brigade at Vimeiro. 

Thomières led a brigade at Corunna, Bussaco, and Fuentes de Oñoro before being appointed to head a division.

References

French generals
French military personnel of the French Revolutionary Wars
French military personnel killed in the Napoleonic Wars
French commanders of the Napoleonic Wars
People from Hérault
1771 births
1812 deaths
Names inscribed under the Arc de Triomphe